Burnt River School is a public K–12 school in Unity, Oregon, United States. It is the only school in the Burnt River School District.

Academics
In 2008, 100% of the school's seniors received a high school diploma. Of seven students, all seven graduated and none dropped out.

References

High schools in Baker County, Oregon
Public high schools in Oregon
Public middle schools in Oregon
Public elementary schools in Oregon